Events from the year 1692 in China.

Qing Dynasty

Incumbents
Monarch - Kangxi Emperor.

Events
Kangxi Emperor recognized Roman Catholic Church.

Births

Deaths

1692